Elsa Salazar Cade (born 1952 in San Antonio, Texas) is a Mexican-American science teacher and entomologist.

Elsa received her undergraduate degree in elementary education at the University of Texas at Austin and her master's in public school administration at Niagara University. She is certified for New York State as a school district administrator.

A long time amateur entomologist, with her husband, William H. Cade, she discovered the first case of a parasite using the sexual signal of a host in order to locate and parasitize the host. She also was selected as one of the top ten science teachers in 1995 by the National Science Teachers Association.

The Cades have done over 30 years of research on the Texas field cricket, Gryllus texensis.

This research has covered the behavior of the field cricket at different densities and under parasitic pressure from the red eyed fly Ormia. She has helped develop a hands-on instructional program for middle school teachers through support from the National Science Foundation at the University at Buffalo. Elsa used to sit on the board of Science Alberta, a not-for-profit foundation committed to science education and awareness. She also sat for many years on the Fifth on Fifth Youth Foundation.  She and her husband have now returned to San Antonio. She sat on the San Antonio Education Foundation Board for several years. 
Dr. Bill Cade and his wife Elsa received a Generosity of Spirit Award from the Association of Fundraising Professionals, Calgary at a National Philanthropy Day in Nov. 2010 in Calgary. 
Elsa Cade, under the name TexMex, spurred the blogosphere to focus on ShelterBox and their urgent need to send shelter and life-saving equipment to Haiti. The blog raised $130,000 to help 1,300 disaster survivors in just a matter of days in March 2010.

References

External links 
Hall of Governors, NY
Including Students With Disabilities Into the General Education Science Classroom
Casting A Wider Net

 Mussel Project in Zambia
Scholar references
inclusion in general science 

American entomologists
Schoolteachers from Texas
American women educators
Hispanic and Latino American teachers
American academics of Mexican descent
Niagara University alumni
Scientists from Buffalo, New York
People from San Antonio
University of Texas at Austin College of Education alumni
Living people
1952 births
People from Bexar County, Texas
Women entomologists
American women biologists
Hispanic and Latino American scientists
21st-century American women